Police Story is an American anthology, crime-drama, television series that aired weekly on NBC from September 25, 1973 through April 5, 1977, followed by a season of irregularly scheduled television film specials from September 27, 1977, to May 28, 1978, with three further television films screened in 1979, 1980, and 1987. The show was created by author and former police officer Joseph Wambaugh and was described by The Complete Directory of Prime Time Network and Cable TV Shows as "one of the more realistic police series to be seen on television". It was produced by David Gerber and Mel Swope.

Overview
Although it was an anthology, all episodes had certain things in common; for instance, the main character in each episode was, obviously, always a police officer. The setting was always Los Angeles, and the characters always worked for some branch of the Los Angeles Police Department. Notwithstanding the anthology format, some characters were recurring. During the first three seasons, Scott Brady appeared in 16 episodes as "Vinnie", a retired cop, who had opened a bar catering to police officers, and who acted as a sort of Greek chorus during the run of the series, commenting on the characters and plots. Others who appeared more than once were Tony Lo Bianco and Don Meredith, each making five appearances as Robbery-Homicide Division partners Tony Calabrese and Bert Jameson, four of these appearances being in the same episodes; Vic Morrow played surveillance specialist Joe LaFrieda in the pilot, "Slow Boy", and in the first-season, two-part episode, "Countdown". Vice officer turned homicide detective Charlie Czonka was played by James Farentino in two episodes, and John Bennett Perry played Officer Chick Torpey five times during the first two seasons, including the pilot film. Chuck Connors and Jackie Cooper also starred in various episodes, as different characters on both sides of the law.

The anthology format allowed the series to depict a wider variety of police activities and experiences than was usual in police dramas. In addition to detectives investigating major crimes, or patrol officers patrolling high-crime beats, the show depicted newly hired cadets trying to make it through the academy, woman officers trying to fit into a male-dominated profession, traffic officers investigating accidents, officers dealing with marital difficulties or alcohol dependence, fingerprint technicians trying to develop suspects from a single print, high-ranking administrators dealing with the stresses of command in a major metropolitan police force, officers adjusting to permanent physical disabilities caused by on-duty injuries, and officers trying to juggle two different jobs to make enough money to support their families.

The anthology format also allowed the show to try out characters and settings for series development, and during its broadcast run, Police Story generated three spin-offs. A first-season episode, "The Gamble", starring Angie Dickinson, became the pilot for the successful Police Woman, which ran from 1974 to 1978. "The Return of Joe Forrester", a second-season episode starring Lloyd Bridges, was developed into the weekly series Joe Forrester, which lasted a full season. Finally, "A Chance to Live", a special episode from the fifth season starring David Cassidy, was spun off into the series Man Undercover. That series did not do as well, and lasted only 10 episodes.

In later seasons, perhaps because of the expense of maintaining the anthology format on a weekly basis, Police Story became a series of irregularly scheduled television films.

Police Story was a precursor to later shows such as NBC's Hill Street Blues (1981-1987), NBC's and CBS's In the Heat of the Night (1988–95), Law & Order (1990-2010), ABC's NYPD Blue (1993-2005), NBC's Homicide: Life on the Street (1993-1999) and FX's The Shield (2002-2008).

Guest stars
Numerous actors, musicians, sports figures, radio personalities and former real-life cops, who were familiar to audiences in the 1960s and 1970s, made appearances on the series, including:

Claude Akins
Edward Albert
Robert Alda
John Amos
Loni Anderson
Tige Andrews
Michael Ansara
Pedro Armendariz Jr.
Desi Arnaz Jr.
Ed Asner
John Astin
Frankie Avalon
Jim Backus
Diane Baker
Kaye Ballard
Martin Balsam
Sandy Baron
Noah Beery, Jr.
Edgar Bergen
Carl Betz
Joan Blondell
Danny Bonaduce
Lloyd Bridges
Jim Brown
Robert Brown
Dick Butkus
Edd Byrnes
Godfrey Cambridge
Joseph Campanella
Jack Carter
David Cassidy
Dennis Cole
Michael Cole
Dabney Coleman 

Gary Collins
Chuck Connors
Mike Connors
Michael Conrad
Bert Convy
Jackie Cooper
James Cromwell
Brandon Cruz
Robert Culp
Cesare Danova
Kim Darby
James Darren
Clifton Davis
Angie Dickinson
Kevin Dobson
David Doyle
Howard Duff
Patty Duke
Vince Edwards
Eddie Egan
Richard Egan
Chad Everett
Shelley Fabares
Antonio Fargas
Norman Fell
Mel Ferrer
Glenn Ford
Robert Forster
John Forsythe
Joe Garagiola
Christopher George
Louis Gossett Jr.
Harold Gould
Robert Goulet
David Groh
Clu Gulager

Larry Hagman
Bernie Hamilton
George Hamilton
Earl Holliman
Rodolfo Hoyos Jr.
Robert Ito
David Janssen
Russell Johnson
Don Johnson
Gordon Jump
Gabe Kaplan
Lenore Kasdorf
Casey Kasem
Celia Kaye
Sally Kirkland
Cheryl Ladd
Hope Lange
Steve Lawrence
Michael Learned
Jerry Lee Lewis
Cleavon Little
Tony Lo Bianco
Gary Lockwood
Tina Louise
John Lupton
Robert Mandan
George Maharis
Darren McGavin
Donna Mills
Martin Milner
Sal Mineo
Cameron Mitchell
Ricardo Montalbán
Vic Morrow
Diana Muldaur
Don Murray
Tony Musante

France Nuyen
Hugh O'Brian
Donald O'Connor
Freda Payne
Joanna Pettet
Paul Picerni
Della Reese
Pernell Roberts
Smokey Robinson
Alex Rocco
John Russell
Kurt Russell
Albert Salmi
Joe Santos
John Saxon
William Schallert
Martha Scott
William Shatner
Gregory Sierra
Dean Smith
Robert Stack
Sylvester Stallone
Stella Stevens
Dean Stockwell
Rufus Thomas
Jan-Michael Vincent
Gary Vinson
John Vivyan
Robert Walden
Dennis Weaver
Stuart Whitman
Larry Wilcox
Cindy Williams
Fred Williamson
Lana Wood
James Woods

Episodes

Awards and nominations
Two episodes received an Edgar Award from the Mystery Writers of America for Best Episode in a Television Series: "Requiem for an Informer", written by Sy Salkowitz (from the first season), and "Requiem for C.Z. Smith" by Robert L. Collins (second season). In 1976, the show won the Primetime Emmy Award for Outstanding Drama Series; it was also among the shows nominated for that award in 1974, 1975, and 1977.

Home media
Shout! Factory (under license from Sony Pictures Home Entertainment) has released the first three seasons of Police Story on DVD in Region 1.

The 1988 revival

From October 29 to December 3, 1988, ABC aired five Police Story TV films using scripts from the original run to fill in for the ABC Mystery Movie, then delayed by the writers' strike. The stars of the films included Ken Olin, Robert Conrad, Lindsay Wagner, and Jack Warden.

Episodes

References

External links

Police Story at CTVA with episode list

1970s American crime drama television series
1970s American police procedural television series
1973 American television series debuts
1977 American television series endings
1970s American anthology television series
Edgar Award-winning works
Fictional portrayals of the Los Angeles Police Department
Primetime Emmy Award for Outstanding Drama Series winners
NBC original programming
Television series by Sony Pictures Television
Television series by Screen Gems
Television shows set in Los Angeles
American detective television series